Michał Ligocki (born 31 October 1985, in Cieszyn) is a Polish snowboarder. He is a participant at the 2014 Winter Olympics in Sochi.

References

1985 births
Snowboarders at the 2006 Winter Olympics
Snowboarders at the 2010 Winter Olympics
Snowboarders at the 2014 Winter Olympics
Living people
Olympic snowboarders of Poland
Polish male snowboarders
People from Cieszyn
Universiade medalists in snowboarding
Universiade bronze medalists for Poland
Competitors at the 2005 Winter Universiade
Competitors at the 2007 Winter Universiade
21st-century Polish people